Hemidactylus lemurinus, also known as the Dhofar leaf-toed gecko or Oman ghost leaf-toed gecko, is a species of gecko. It is endemic to Oman.

References

Hemidactylus
Reptiles described in 1980
Endemic fauna of Oman
Reptiles of the Middle East